Grethe Grünberg (born 17 December 1988) is an Estonian former ice dancer. With partner Kristjan Rand, she is the 2007 World Junior silver medalist and the 2005–2007 Estonian national champion.

Career 
Grünberg began learning to skate in 1992. She teamed up with Kristjan Rand a few years later. 

Grünberg/Rand debuted on the ISU Junior Grand Prix series in 2002, placing 12th in Germany. In 2004, they made their first appearance at the World Junior Championships, finishing 18th.

At the 2005 Tallinn Cup, Grünberg/Rand became the first Estonian ice dancers to win a JGP medal, bronze. They were 9th at the 2006 World Junior Championships.

In the 2006–07 season, Grünberg/Rand won gold and silver at their two JGP events and qualified for the ISU Junior Grand Prix Final where they placed 5th. They won the silver medal at the 2007 World Junior Championships, behind Ekaterina Bobrova / Dmitri Soloviev and ahead of Kaitlyn Weaver / Andrew Poje. It was Estonia's first medal at an ISU Championships. Grünberg/Rand made their senior international debut in the same season, finishing 15th at the 2007 European Championships and 19th at the 2007 World Championships.

The duo missed the 2007–2008 skating season due to injury. Grünberg eventually retired due to injury.

Programs 
with Rand

Results
JGP: Junior Grand Prix

with Rand

References

External links 

 

Estonian female ice dancers
Living people
1988 births
Figure skaters from Tallinn
World Junior Figure Skating Championships medalists